Athabasca-Redwater was a provincial electoral district in Alberta, Canada mandated to return a single member to the Legislative Assembly of Alberta using the first-past-the-post method of voting from 2004 to 2012.

The district in rural northern Alberta was created in the 2004 boundary redistribution out of a large portion of Barrhead-Westlock and Athabasca-Wabasca in the north as well as a portion of Redwater on the eastern side. The district had three major towns: Bon Accord, Redwater and Athabasca.

The district and its antecedents favored Progressive Conservative candidates in recent years. There were two representatives in the district.

History
The Athabasca-Redwater electoral district was created in the 2003 electoral boundary re-distribution from parts of the electoral districts of Athabasca-Wabasca, Barrhead-Westlock and Redwater.

The 2010 electoral boundary re-distribution saw the electoral district change to align to new municipal boundaries on the northern and western edges. The electoral district was renamed Athabasca-Sturgeon-Redwater. The change in name and boundaries took effect at the drop of the writ for the 2012 Alberta general election.

Boundary history

Representation history

The electoral district was created in the 2004 boundary redistribution. The election held that year saw incumbent Progressive Conservative Cabinet Minister Mike Cardinal who previously represented the Athabasca-Wabasca electoral district win here. He defeated five other candidates with just under half the popular vote to pick up the new district for his party.

Cardinal kept his spot in cabinet and was shuffled to the Human Resources and Employment portfolio by Premier Ralph Klein. He was shuffled to the backbenches in 2006 and retired from the legislature at dissolution 2008.

The second representative of the district was Progressive Conservative MLA Jeff Johnson. He was elected for the first time in 2008 with a landslide majority.

Legislature results

2004 general election

2008 general election

Senate nominee district results

2004 Senate nominee election district results

Voters had the option of selecting 4 candidates on the ballot.

Student vote results

2004 election

On November 19, 2004, a student vote was conducted at participating Alberta schools to parallel the 2004 Alberta general election results. The vote was designed to educate students and simulate the electoral process for persons who had not yet reached the legal majority. The vote was conducted in 80 of the 83 provincial electoral districts, with students voting for actual election candidates. Schools with a large student body who resided in another electoral district had the option to vote for candidates outside of the electoral district than where they were physically located.

See also
List of Alberta provincial electoral districts

References

Further reading

External links
Elections Alberta
The Legislative Assembly of Alberta

Former provincial electoral districts of Alberta
Athabasca, Alberta